Mount Vernon is a suburb of Sydney, in the state of New South Wales, Australia. Mount Vernon is 42 kilometres west of the Sydney central business district, in the local government area of the City of Penrith and is part of the Greater Western Sydney region.

Mount Vernon is a sparsely populated rural suburb providing a close community atmosphere for its residents. It is a hilly suburb with views all the way to the Blue Mountains. Kemps Creek forms its northern and western boundary with Mamre Road providing a boundary on its west along with Kemps Creek.

History
Mount Vernon takes its name from the land granted in 1820 to Anthony Fenn Kemp (1773–1868). It was presumably named after Mount Vernon, George Washington's home in Virginia in the United States of America. Some roads around Mount Vernon were named after U.S. Presidents.

Garfield Road – James A. Garfield

Lincoln Road – Abraham Lincoln

Truman Road – Harry S. Truman

References

External links
 Penrith Local Suburb Profiles

Suburbs of Sydney
City of Penrith
Australian places named after U.S. places or U.S. history